Taylor Timothy Twellman (born February 29, 1980) is an American former soccer player who played professionally from 1999 to 2010. He now works in the media as a soccer television commentator for MLS Season Pass on Apple TV.

Twellman is best known for his play with the New England Revolution of Major League Soccer (MLS) from 2002 to 2009, during which time he scored more goals in MLS than any other player. He was the youngest player to score 100 goals in MLS in 2009 at the age of 29, and is New England's all-time leading goal scorer. Twellman was a five-time MLS all-star and in 2005 was the league MVP. Twellman also earned 30 caps for the United States national team, scoring 6 international goals.

Twellman has been active since his retirement in promoting awareness of concussions and working in the media as a color commentator for ESPN/ABC until 2023 and for Apple TV since 2023.

Youth and college
Taylor was raised in St. Louis, Missouri, and attended Saint Louis University High School (SLUH), where he was an all-star athlete in American football, basketball, soccer, and baseball, during which he was offered a contract by the Kansas City Royals baseball team. After graduating from SLUH in 1998, Twellman rejected the offer, electing to play soccer at Maryland on an athletic scholarship.  At Maryland, Twellman played soccer in 1998 and 1999; in 1998 Twellman was named a second-team All American for the squad, and in his sophomore 1999 season he finished as a runner-up for both the Hermann Trophy and the MAC Player of the Year Award. After only two seasons with the Terrapins, Twellman left college to turn professional.

Professional career
In 2000, Twellman signed with German Bundesliga club 1860 Munich. He spent two years with the team, but played for the reserve team in Division III, and never played above the reserve level.

Twellman returned to the U.S. when he was drafted second overall by the New England Revolution in the 2002 MLS SuperDraft. In Twellman's first season in MLS, he established himself as one of the best players in the league, scoring 23 goals. He finished second in league MVP voting, and was named to the 2002 MLS Best XI. In the 2003 season, despite being beset by a number of injuries, Twellman finished tied with Carlos Ruiz of the L.A. Galaxy for top goalscorer of the league with 15. His production went down in 2004, as he ended up with just nine goals.

Twellman's best MLS season came in 2005, winning both the Major League Soccer MVP Award and MLS Golden Boot, and finishing the regular season with 17 goals. He was also named to the 2005 MLS Best XI.
Twellman was the target of transfer talk when Odd Grenland of Norway reportedly made a $1.2 million bid for him, which MLS rejected. In February 2007, New England announced they had signed Twellman to a four-year contract, reportedly worth $5 million.

In 2007, Twellman won his first title with the Revolution: the US Open Cup, a season in which he finished third in MLS in goals scored. The Revolution also won the Eastern Conference title, with Twellman scoring a spectacular bicycle kick against the Chicago Fire to secure the Revs' spot in the 2007 MLS Cup. Twellman scored the opening goal of the 2007 MLS Cup against Houston Dynamo. However, this would be New England's only goal as they would go on to lose their third straight MLS Cup by a score of 2–1.

In January 2008, English Championship team Preston North End attempted to entice Major League Soccer and the New England Revolution to sell Twellman. Preston initially advanced an offer of $1.7 million, but MLS and the team rejected that offer, rejected another offer of $2.5 million, and then rejected another bid for $3 to $3.5 million, which would have been the fourth highest and possibly the second highest transfer fee in MLS history to date.

Injuries and retirement
Twellman suffered a neck injury and a serious concussion from a mid-air collision against Los Angeles Galaxy goalkeeper Steve Cronin on August 30, 2008. Twellman played the rest of the 2008 season, but due to lingering symptoms from his whiplash and concussion, he played only two games in 2009. Twellman had planned to make his return during the 2010 season, but he was unable to play that season and was placed on the season-ending injury list. After struggling to find any playing time over the past three seasons in MLS due to his head injury, Twellman announced his retirement from the game at the end of the 2010 MLS season.

International career
Twellman began his involvement with the U.S. national program at youth level with the U-17 and U-20 squads. He first gained professional attention after scoring four goals for the U-20 national team at the 1999 World Youth Championship while still playing with the University of Maryland. He also represented the United States at the 1999 Pan American Games.

After establishing himself in MLS, Twellman made his first appearance with the senior U.S. national team on November 17, 2002 against El Salvador. He struggled to score his first international goal, having several apparent goals waved off for offside infractions. He finally scored against Panama in a World Cup qualifier on October 12, 2005. He improved his chances for a spot on the 2006 World Cup team in a friendly against Norway on January 29, 2006. In the game, he scored the ninth hat trick in U.S. national team history, but was ultimately left off the World Cup roster by coach Bruce Arena.

Twellman was selected by new U.S. coach Bob Bradley as a member of the U.S. squad for the 2007 CONCACAF Gold Cup, scoring in a group stage win over El Salvador. Twellman gradually fell out of the national team pool in the following years after a series of concussions sidelined his club career.

Post-retirement

Since retirement, Twellman has created the THINKTaylor foundation, a charitable organization regarding sports-related concussions.
Twellman has agreed to donate his brain to science after death. His brain could be of use to determine whether multiple concussions cause permanent harm to the brain.

Twellman Soccer provides programs and tools for players, coaches and organizations across the United States.

Media career

Twellman has had an active media career after retiring as a player. He joined ESPN/ABC from November 2011 until January 2023 as a soccer analyst, serving as lead color commentator for their Major League Soccer coverage alongside lead play-by-play commentator Adrian Healey and later Jon Champion. He also hosted a weekly recap show about the league, MLS Rewind, on ESPN+. Twellman called the 2012, 2016, and 2020 European Championships, and in 2014 Twellman was the USMNT lead color commentator in the World Cup in Brazil. He left the network in January 2023 to join Apple's MLS coverage.

Personal life
Taylor's father Tim Twellman, and uncles Mike Twellman and Steve Twellman, all played professionally in the North American Soccer League. Taylor's brother James Twellman played with the San Jose Earthquakes reserves in 2002. Taylor's grandfather, Jim Delsing, was a Major League Baseball outfielder in the 1950s for five teams. His uncle is golfer Jay Delsing.

Career statistics

MLS

Honors
New England Revolution
 U.S. Open Cup: 2007
 North American SuperLiga: 2008

United States
 CONCACAF Gold Cup: 2007

Individual
 Major League Soccer MVP: 2005
 MLS Golden Boot: 2005
 MLS Best XI: 2002, 2005

In 2004, Twellman received the inaugural Keough Award, which recognizes the outstanding male soccer player from the St. Louis area.

References

External links

 
 
 Taylor Twellman profile at Soccer New England

1980 births
Living people
Soccer players from St. Louis
American soccer players
Association football forwards
Maryland Terrapins men's soccer players
TSV 1860 Munich II players
New England Revolution draft picks
New England Revolution players
Regionalliga players
Major League Soccer players
Major League Soccer All-Stars
United States men's youth international soccer players
United States men's under-20 international soccer players
United States men's international soccer players
Footballers at the 1999 Pan American Games
2003 FIFA Confederations Cup players
2007 CONCACAF Gold Cup players
2007 Copa América players
Pan American Games bronze medalists for the United States
Pan American Games medalists in football
CONCACAF Gold Cup-winning players
American expatriate soccer players
American expatriate soccer players in Germany
Major League Soccer broadcasters
Concussion activists
Medalists at the 1999 Pan American Games